Isak Vidjeskog (born 28 March 2004), is a Finnish professional footballer who plays as a midfielder for Kalmar FF.

References

External links

Living people
2004 births
Finnish footballers
Association football midfielders
Kalmar FF players
Allsvenskan players